The Public Services Ombudsman (Wales) Act 2005 (c 10) is an Act of the Parliament of the United Kingdom. It creates the office of Public Services Ombudsman for Wales.

Section 40 - Commencement
The Public Services Ombudsman (Wales) Act 2005 (Commencement No. 1 and Transitional Provisions and Savings) Order 2005 (S.I. 2005/2800 (W. 199) (C. 116) was made under this section.

Section 43 - Consequential, transitional provisions etc
The Public Services Ombudsman (Wales) Act 2005 (Consequential Amendments to the Local Government Pension Scheme Regulations 1997 and Transitional Provisions) Order 2006 (S.I. 2006/1011 (W. 104)) was made under section 43(1).

References
Halsbury's Statutes,

External links
The Public Services Ombudsman (Wales) Act 2005, as amended from the National Archives.
The Public Services Ombudsman (Wales) Act 2005, as originally enacted from the National Archives.
Explanatory notes to the Public Services Ombudsman (Wales) Act 2005.

Ombudsman posts
United Kingdom Acts of Parliament 2005
Acts of the Parliament of the United Kingdom concerning Wales
2005 in Wales